Qiqihar University is an institution for higher education, founded in 1953 in Qiqihar city of Heilongjiang province in northeast China. Its campus has an area of 1.15 km². It is the only provincial, comprehensive, regular institution of higher learning in the western part of Heilongjiang Province.

It is beside Labor Lake in the city of Qiqihar. Covering an area of 1.25 square kilometers with a building area of 720,000 square meters, it is nicknamed 'The Round Lake University' and has been awarded titles such as 'Garden University' and 'Provincial Model Unit' by the Heilongjiang Provincial Committee of the CPC and the People's Government of Heilongjiang Province.

Colleges
 Chemistry and Chemical Engineering
 Computer and Control Engineering
 Sciences
 Humanities
 Life Sciences and Engineering
 Arts
 Physical Education
 Foreign Languages
 Economics and Management
 Light Industry and Textiles
 Mechanical Engineering
 Communication and Electronic Engineering
 Education and Communication
 International Exchange

The university has several teaching and auxiliary teaching departments: a Computer Center, a Network and Audio-visual Education Center, a Department of Social Sciences, Libraries, and the Hermann Gmeiner Vocational Technical School. This is a cooperative program with SOS Children's Villages International.

Studies
 High Polymer Material and Engineering
 English
 Bioscience
 Chemical Engineering and Technology
 Light Chemical Engineering
 Management of Business Administration
 Applied Chemistry
 Genetics and Analytical Chemistry

Faculty
Qiqihar University has a highly competitive faculty and a well-reasoned faculty structure.

Qiqihar University consists of 1347 full-time teachers, 72 of which hold doctoral degrees and 679 holding master's degrees. Nineteen experts enjoy special national government allowances. Three are tutors of postgraduate candidates, 168 are tutors of graduate candidates, 167 are professors, and 442 are associate professors.

77% of the faculty hold doctoral and master's degrees. It is staffed with 1,510 full-time teachers in total, including 683 professors and associate professors, 183 doctoral and postgraduate supervisors, as well as 15 foreign teachers teaching and lecturing in the university.

A batch of experts and scholars famous at home and abroad gather in Qiqihar University. Among them, there is a academician of the Russian Academy of Sciences, 2 distinguished professors of “Longjing Scholars Program”, 20 experts enjoy special national government allowances, and 3 experts enjoy special provincial government allowances. Besides, more than 30 teachers are national and provincial honor winners of “National Outstanding teacher” or “National Model Teacher”, there are 5 provincial distinguished teachers and 3 provincial teaching teams.

Academic life
In recent years, Qiqihar University has realized rapid development. Now, it consists of 22 colleges, including the college of Chemistry and Chemical Engineering, Literature and History and Culture, Computer and Control Engineering, Life Sciences and Agriculture and Forestry, Foreign Languages, Mechanical Engineering, Materials Science and Engineering, Physical Education, Applied Technology, International Education, Architecture and Civil Engineering, Economics and Management, Light Industry and Textiles, Food and Biology Engineering, Music and Dance, Art and Design, Philosophy and Law, Communication and Electronic Engineering, Sciences, Education and Communication, Marxism and Continuing Education.

The university has several teaching and auxiliary teaching departments: Modern Education Technology Center, Public Foreign Language Teaching and Research Department and Libraries.

Qiqihar University offers 83 undergraduate specialties that are subordinate to 11 disciplines. Four of the specialties are national characteristic specialties; two of the specialties, including Bioscience and Chemical Engineering and Technology, are national comprehensive reform pilot specialties; two of the specialties, including High Polymer Material and Engineering and Applied Chemistry, are provincial comprehensive reform pilot specialties; 17 of the specialties, including Law, High Polymer Material and Engineering, Business Administration, Process Equipment and Control Engineering, Chinese Language and Literature, Chemical Engineering and Technology, Education, Fine Arts, Light Chemistry Engineering, Biology Engineering, Bioscience, Physical Education, Clothing Art Design, Music Performance, Applied Chemistry, English and Pharmaceutical Engineering are provincial key specialties; 21 courses won the award of “Provincial Top-quality Course”; 4 categories of master's degree authorization are provided (seven master's degrees of engineering, 15 master's degrees of education, three master's degrees of physical education and a master's degree of accounting); and the University has been given sanction to work on a new Doctor's Degree Conferring Unit.

The R&D Center of Flax-processing Technology is authorized as an engineering research center by the Ministry of Education. Two laboratories, including the Laboratory of Surfactant and the Laboratory of Industrial Auxiliary, are provincial key laboratories. There are two key laboratories of provincial universities: a Laboratory of the Industry of Fine Chemicals, and a Laboratory of the Processing of Agricultural Products. Nenjiang History and Culture Research Base is entitled provincial philosophy and sciences research base. Four R&D Centers, including Deep Processing of Agricultural Products (corn), Fine Processing of Soybean, Linen Processing Technology, and Popular Polymer Composite Modification are provincial R&D centers of engineering technology of a provincial university and play the role of the chairman unit of corn deep processing industry technology innovation strategic alliance in Heilongjiang Province.

The Training Center of the Industry of Fine Chemicals and the Training Center of the Processing Technology of Cereal, Oil and Foodstuffs are provincial talent training centers for rejuvenating the old industrial bases of Northeastern China. The university also has a provincial innovative experimental center of talent training mode, three provincial demonstrative centers of experimental teaching, and four provincial demonstrative base for innovation and the creative cultivation of postgraduates, which has an R&D base in Beijing.

Scientific research

Qiqihar University is strengthened by scientific research through advancing the high-level and distinctive research. In recent years, the university undertook 658 scientific research projects, including 44 national level and 132 provincial level research projects. More than 10 science and technology awards were obtained at or above provincial level. The number of academic papers, which are published in EI, SCI, CSSCI and key journals, has been increasing annually.

Qiqihar university enrolls students from 30 provinces, autonomous regions and municipalities which are under the control of the Central Government of our country. It has formed a perfect educational provisional system of 26,004 students, including 24,547 full-time undergraduates, 1,246 postgraduates, 211 degree-eligible foreign students and 6,423 correspondence students.

Facilities
Qiqihar University has advanced and enriched teaching conditions and facilities. These include 2,710,000 volumes in the library, 530,000 electronic volumes, 17 Chinese and foreign databases, 3 electronic reading rooms, 5 reading rooms specializing in social sciences or foreign language materials, 134 classrooms functioning as modernized language labs, multi-media classrooms, all online teaching record-anchor multimedia classrooms are in centralized control and management.

The university and students also enjoy the first class gymnasium, natatorium, music hall and students’ recreation and sports activities center.

 University library consisting of 2,106,200 volumes
 6 electronic reading rooms
 6 reading rooms specializing in social sciences or foreign language materials
 107 classrooms functioning as modernized language labs
 Multi-media classrooms
 2 distance online teaching record-anchor multimedia classrooms

The school and students are further provided with 14 distance network classrooms, a gymnasium, a stadium, a swimming pool and a music hall which are first-class in the province.

Three academic periodicals are published at home and abroad:
 The Journal of Qiqihar University (Philosophy and Social Science Edition)
 The Journal of Qiqihar University (Natural Science Edition)
 The Journal of Science of the Teachers College and University

Guiding concept
Qiqihar University's guiding concept is to uphold Deng Xiao-ping's theory, and the important thought of the Three Representatives as guidelines, to advance the scientific concept on development as a command, to fully implement the Party's policy on education, to adhere to the unity of “large-scale, scientific organization, and fine quality with high efficiency,” and to follow the road towards developing these essential qualities.

The university stands in Heilongjiang to serve local economic construction and social development, and to keep teaching as the central task, and to improve the quality of teaching as the lifeline of the university. The university unswervingly takes the cultivation of high-level professionals and senior specialists as the basic task to building the university into a provincial key comprehensive university.

Through years of exploration and practice, the university has formed its special features: “Carrying forward the fine tradition of working hard, with a pioneering spirit and a dedication to the frontier, of cultivating surefooted, industrious and competent high-level professionals.”

For years, the university, upholding the thought that “development is the first task,” has been unceasingly deepening programs of reform, development, and the construction of various undertakings, and has made great achievements.

The university lays emphasis on developing campus culture by holding colorful cultural activities. In 2006, the Qiqihar University Symphony Orchestra held a tour event entitled “Fine Art Spreads over Campus” under the nomination of the Ministry of Education, in 2012, the co-produced musical “The Daur People” won the gold award of Chinese Ethnic Arts Festival and became one of the 50 “Homage to Chinese Traditional Culture” projects.

The university highly values academic exchanges and has achieved many positive results by establishing inter-collegiate contacts. It has had academic exchanges and established ties with cooperatively-run schools with some domestic colleges, and 24 colleges from eight foreign countries like the US, Great Britain, Japan, South Korea, Russia, Canada, Austria, and Ireland.

Qiqihar University has preserved and promoted its principles in running the university over the last 50 years. By working industriously, it has trained over 126,000 talented persons. They are all over the country, but most of them take root in Longjiang. They have been well received at their posts because they are willing to work their way up, they are happy in bearing hardships, they dedicate themselves to their work, and they are good at learning and doing. In the past decade, they have completed more than 1,600 research projects, a number of which have been materialized in time to make great contributions to local economic construction and social development.

With the inspiring motto “Cultivation of Righteousness and Virtue, Construction of Refinement and Spontaneity”, Qiqihar University is geared to the needs of the future, seizes all opportunities, and promotes a truth-seeking and pioneering spirit necessary for building the university into a provincial key university.

Exchange and international cooperation
The university has established inter-collegiate contacts domestically and abroad. It has had academic exchanges with 24 colleges from eight foreign countries: the United States, Great Britain, Japan, South Korea, Russia, Canada, Austria, and Ireland.

References

External links
Qiqihar University - Welcome from the President of Qiqihar University

 
Educational institutions established in 1953
Universities and colleges in Heilongjiang
Qiqihar
1953 establishments in China